Reginald Lloyd Halton (11 July 1916 – 17 March 1988) was an English footballer. His regular position was left half. He was born in Leek, Staffordshire. He played for Cheddington Mental Hospital, Notts County, and Manchester United. He also played for Bury, Chesterfield and Leicester City. During World War II, he played as a guest for Aldershot and also played for Arsenal against Moscow Dynamo. He was later manager of Scarborough and Leek Town.

He also played cricket for Staffordshire in the Minor Counties Championship between 1938 and 1956, making 34 appearances. He was a left-handed batsman.

References

External links
Profile at MUFCInfo.com

1916 births
1988 deaths
English footballers
English football managers
Notts County F.C. players
Manchester United F.C. players
Scarborough F.C. managers
Leek Town F.C. managers
English cricketers
Staffordshire cricketers
Bury F.C. players
Chesterfield F.C. players
Leicester City F.C. players
Sportspeople from Leek, Staffordshire
Association football wing halves
Stafford Rangers F.C. players
Buxton F.C. players
Arsenal F.C. wartime guest players
Aldershot F.C. wartime guest players
Rochdale A.F.C. wartime guest players